Fernside is a neighborhood of Alameda in Alameda County, California. It lies at an elevation of 13 feet (4 m). Located near the Fruitvale and High Street bridges, it previously contained one train line which passed over the Fruitvale Bridge and another which followed the perimeter of Alameda's South Shore.

References

Neighborhoods in Alameda, California